The 2014–15 Armenian Cup was the 24th season of Armenia's football knockout competition. It featured the eight 2014–15 Premier League teams, but no team from the 2014–15 First Division. The tournament began on 1 October 2014, with Pyunik the defending champions, having won their six title the previous season.

Results

Quarter-finals
All eight Premier League clubs competed in this round. The first legs were played on 17 September and 1 October 2014, while the second legs were played on 20 October and 15 November 2014.

|}

Semi-finals
The four winners from the quarterfinals entered this round. The first legs were played on 18 and 19 March 2015, with the second legs to be competed on 15 and 16 April 2015.

|}

Final

References

Armenian Cup seasons
Armenian Cup
Cup